Can refer to: 

 Pointe Coupée Slave Conspiracy of 1791
 Pointe Coupée Slave Conspiracy of 1795